First Parish Church in Plymouth is a historic Unitarian Universalist church at the base of Burial Hill on the town square off Leyden Street in Plymouth, Massachusetts. The congregation was founded in 1620 by the Pilgrims in Plymouth. The current building was constructed in 1899.

History

Congregation
The congregation was founded in the English community of Scrooby in 1606 by the Pilgrims, a group of Protestant Christians.  After they emigrated to North America in 1620, the Separatist congregation established a church in Plymouth which became a parish church of Massachusetts' state church, the Congregational church.  Eventually, a schism developed in 1801, when much of the congregation adopted Unitarianism along with many of the other state churches in Massachusetts; the Congregationalist dissenters broke away to form the Church of the Pilgrimage. All state churches were disaffiliated with the government by 1834.
The congregation is currently affiliated with the Unitarian Universalist Association and has 64 members as of 2016.

Buildings
Originally, the congregation held Christian services on the Mayflower and then at a fort on Burial Hill from 1621 until 1648. The fort was also used for other colony events including meetings of the Plymouth General Court.  In 1648 the first of four church buildings on the town square was constructed. Later churches were built in 1684, 1744, and 1831. Hartwell, Richardson & Driver designed the current Romanesque-style building, completed 1899, which replaced the 1831 wooden Gothic structure.  The 1899 building was listed on the National Register of Historic Places in 2014.  It has Tiffany stained glass windows illustrating the Pilgrim story. The sanctuary features carved quarter-sawn oak and is one of the finest examples of hammer beam construction in the United States.

Gallery

See also
First Parish Church (Duxbury, Massachusetts)
Oldest churches in the United States
National Register of Historic Places listings in Plymouth County, Massachusetts

References

External links
First Parish website
 The historical records for the First Parish Church in Plymouth are in the Andover-Harvard Theological Library at Harvard Divinity School in Cambridge, Massachusetts.

Churches completed in 1899
19th-century Unitarian Universalist church buildings
Unitarian Universalist churches in Massachusetts
Plymouth Colony
17th-century Protestant churches
Buildings and structures in Plymouth, Massachusetts
Churches in Plymouth County, Massachusetts
National Register of Historic Places in Plymouth County, Massachusetts
Churches on the National Register of Historic Places in Massachusetts
1606 establishments in England
Hartwell and Richardson buildings